Hit, also known as Peter Gabriel: The Definitive Two CD Collection, is a 2003 compilation album of songs by the English rock musician Peter Gabriel. It reached No. 29 in the UK albums chart and No. 100 in the US. Disc one is labelled Hit and disc two Miss, reflecting the first disc which comprises Gabriel's best known chart singles and the second featuring his more obscure material.

The two-disc set is different in the UK and US because of the second disc. The second disc in the US spans fourteen songs by Gabriel, whilst the UK second disc features fifteen songs. Only some of these appeared on the US version. The UK version collects at least one track from every studio album by Gabriel, including soundtracks, except for Birdy, which is the only album not represented by a track.

The album is Gabriel's first compilation album since 1990's Shaking the Tree: Sixteen Golden Greats.

Track listing 
All songs written by Peter Gabriel, except "Burn You Up, Burn You Down", by Gabriel, Neil Sparkes and Karl Wallinger.

Disc one 

*This is the single release with a more radio-friendly repeat of the line "Whistling tunes we're kissing baboons in the jungle" from the first chorus.

**While labelled as the radio edit in the liner notes, "Steam" is actually the same length as its album version.

Disc two 

*Tracks 2, 5, 7, and 14 are taken from the German language album editions Peter Gabriel - Ein deutsches Album (1980) and Peter Gabriel - deutsches Album (1982). All other songs are sung in English. The German titles of these tracks are only for the album sleeves. The German edition of disc 1 is identical to the standard edition except that the song titles are translated into German on the album sleeves.

Charts

Certifications

References

External links

2003 greatest hits albums
Peter Gabriel albums
Geffen Records compilation albums
Virgin Records compilation albums
Real World Records compilation albums
Albums produced by Bob Ezrin
Albums produced by Steve Lillywhite
Albums produced by Daniel Lanois
Albums produced by Stephen Hague